Jadson André (Natal, 13 March 1990) is a Brazilian professional surfer.

Biography 
Jadson started surfing at the age of 10 on the beaches of Natal, Rio Grande do Norte, including Ponta Negra beach, one of the mais tourist city spot sights, where Morro do Careca is located. Jadson was raised by his family in the city of Alexandria, where he spent part of his childhood.

Jadson Andre’s poor teenage parents weren’t at all keen on Jadson surfing as a youngster because of its counter-cultural associations and thought he should concentrate on soccer. An uncle however introduced him to the sport and would often take him surfing in secret. Before long though, he started winning local comps, and was offered a contract with Oakley, and hit the international circuit. He qualified for the CT in 2010 and in his rookie season won at home at the Billabong Pro Santa Catarina defeating none other than Kelly Slater in the Final. 

Currently he can be considered one of the best professional surfers in Brazil.

Honours 

 Junior world champion
 2x runner-up pro world champion
 WQS 6 - Prime champion in Durban 2009
 Third place on the WQS World Circuit
 2010 Hang Loose Santa Catarina Pro in Imbituba, Santa Catarina.

ASP World Tour 
One of his greatest achievements in the sport was the title of the Brazilian leg of the ASP World Tour held in 2010, in Imbituba (SC) with a brilliant victory, beating one of the greatest surfers in activity, the American Kelly Slater, eleven times world champion.

Only 20 years old and a debutant in the elite division of world surfing, he won his first victory in the Brazilian stage of the ASP World Tour on April 29, 2010 in Imbituba. Brazil's last title at home had been with former brazilian surfer Peterson Rosa, from Paraná, in 1998, when he was still competing in the tour.

References

External links 

 «Terra - Conheça o brasileiro que barrou a lenda Slater em sua 1ª final» 
 «G1 - Filho de jogador, Jadson se divide entre o amor por dois esportes e dois clubes»

World Surf League surfers
1990 births
Living people